This list is of the Cultural Properties of Japan designated in the category of  for the Prefecture of Fukui.

National Cultural Properties
As of 1 November 2014, fourteen Important Cultural Properties have been designated.

Prefectural Cultural Properties
As of 21 August 2014, sixty-one properties have been designated at a prefectural level.

See also
 Cultural Properties of Japan
 List of National Treasures of Japan (paintings)
 Japanese painting
 List of Historic Sites of Japan (Fukui)

References

External links
  Cultural Properties in Fukui Prefecture

Cultural Properties,Fukui
Cultural Properties,Paintings
Paintings,Fukui
Lists of paintings